Waman "Dādā" Bapuji Metre (14 February 1906 – 21 November 1970) was the doyen of Indian petroleum geologists. He was awarded India's third-highest civilian award, the Padma Bhushan in 1968, for his contribution to petroleum exploration and development in India and for his 'significant contribution to the growth of the oil industry in the country'.

Biography
Metre was born on February 14, 1906, in Kalamb, Yavatmal, Maharashtra, India. He graduated from Indian School of Mines, Dhanbad in 1930. He joined Assam Oil Company (AOC) in Digboi, Assam, in 1930 and was the first Indian Geologist to head its exploration activity. After Burmah Oil, the parent of AOC, formed Oil India as a joint venture with the Government of India, he moved to New Delhi in 1961 as its Chief Technical Advisor and was concurrently Member (part-time), Oil and Natural Gas Commission (ONGC)    

He was elected to the membership of Indian National Science Academy (INSA) in 1956. He was a fellow of Geological Society of London, and served as the President (Geology section) of the 1961 Indian Science Congress Association.

Kshama Metre, Indian rural development leader and pediatrician, is his daughter. Since she also won a Padma award, the two represent a very rare case of Padma award conferred to a father and  daughter.  List_of_parents-children_who_won_Padma_awards

See also 
 List of Padma Bhushan award recipients (1960–1969)

References 

20th-century Indian geologists
Recipients of the Padma Bhushan in science & engineering
People in the petroleum industry
Scientists from Nagpur
Scientists from Maharashtra
1906 births
1970 deaths
People from Yavatmal district
Marathi people
Burmah-Castrol
Petroleum industry in India
Indian Institute of Technology (Indian School of Mines), Dhanbad alumni